Edoardo Ricci (27 April 1928 – 28 November 2008) was an Italian Bishop for the Catholic Church.

Born in 1928, Ricci was ordained as a Priest at the age of 23 on 8 October 1950. He was appointed Bishop of the Roman Catholic Diocese of San Miniato, Italy on 27 February 1987 by Pope John Paul II and ordained Bishop on 7 June that year. He retired as Bishop on 6 March 2004 after nearly 17 years. He died on 28 November 2008.

See also

Notes

1928 births
2008 deaths
20th-century Italian Roman Catholic bishops
21st-century Italian Roman Catholic bishops